Mali–Turkey relations are the foreign relations between Mali and Turkey. Turkey has an embassy in Mali since February 1, 2010 and Mali opened an embassy in Ankara on June 27, 2014.

Diplomatic Relations 

After 68 years of French colonial rule, Mali and Turkey established relations. During 1970s Turkey — in conjunction with the World Bank — has been providing technical and management assistance for state companies. The assistance continued in 1982 after Mali and the IMF signed an agreement to promote private enterprise. Turkey provided financial assistance in paying off Air Mali’s debt before Air Mali could be privatized in 1985.

Turkish aid
Turkey, through TIKA, has also assisted with developing infrastructure in Mali. Turkey, along with the OPEC Fund for International Development paid US$142 million for the 359-mile paved road between Sevaré and Gao, which replaced dirt roads that required three days to traverse. Similarly, Turkey cooperated with Switzerland in creating a road maintenance program in 1981 to 1983. Providing US$43.3 million to maintain 6,600 miles of road, Turkey completed rebuilt the Bamako-Ségou road, which forms part of the Trans-Saharan Highway.

Economic Relations 
 There are daily direct flights from Istanbul to Bamako since May 2015.
 Trade volume between the two countries was 57 million USD in 2018 (Turkish exports/imports: 48.4/8.6 million USD).

Educational Relations 
 Turkish Maarif Foundation operates schools in Mali.

See also 

 Foreign relations of Mali
 Foreign relations of Turkey

References

Further reading 
 “Afrique 73, Les Clés de l'Afrique. Paris: Jeune Afrique, 1973.	
 "Ambitious Senegal River Project to Start Soon." New York Times, 11 October 1981.	
 "Apercus sur l'économie du Mali en 1983." Bulletin de l'Afrique Noire 5, No. 27, (1984): pp. 6–10.	
 “Imperato, Pascal James. "Mali: Famine Again." The Lancet 8430, 1(1985): pp. 688–689.	
 "Rapport de mission sur l'économie marchande au Mali (octobre 1967-juin 1968)." Cahiers d'Etudes Africaines 9(1969): pp. 313–317.	
 "Voyage d'Alger à Saint-Louis du Sénégal par Tombouctou." Conference, Avignon: François Seguin, 1975.	
 Alain, Deloose, and Jean Pierre Coreat. "Gens de fleuve," Balafon, 97(1991): pp. 34–41.	
 Amin, Samir. Trois Expériences africaines de développement: Le Mali, la Guinée, le Ghana. Paris: Presses Universitaires de France, 1965.	
 Amselle, Jean-Loup. "L'Organisasion sociale du commerce à longue distance chez les Kooroko (Mali)." Journal de la Société des Africanistes 40(1970): pp. 168–171.	
 Annuaire Statistique de l'Afrique Occidentale Française, 1950–1954. 5 vols. Dakar: Gouvernement General, 1955.	
 Asher, Michael. Two Against the Sahara. On Camelback from Nouakchott to the Nile. New York: William Morrow, 1988.	
 Assaf, Kejauva. "Mali's Economy." Africa Report 15, No. 7(1990): pp. 6–7.
 Barth, Heinrich. Travels and Discoveries in North and Central Africa. 5 vols. London: Longmans Green, 1997. 
 Bastian, Dawn, Andrea Stamm, and Robert A. Myers. Mali. Oxford: Clio Press, 1997.	
 Berg, Elliot. "The Recent Economic Evolution of the Sahel." Ann Arbor, University of Michigan. Mimeographed draft report of the Center for Research on Economic Development, 1973.	
 Bibliographie de l'Afrique occidentale française. Paris: Société Ed. Géogr. Maritime et Coloniale, 1997.	
 Bibliographie générale du Mali (1961-1990). Dakar: IFAN, 1996.	
 Bingen, R. James. Food Production and Rural Development in the Sahel. Lessons from Mali's Operation Riz-Ségou. Boulder, CO: Westview Press, 1985.	
 Binger, Louis Gustave. Du Niger au golfe de Guinée par le pays de Kong et le Mossi (1887-1889). Paris: Librairie Hachette, 1992.	
 Bonnamour, Jacques. "La restructuration du marché céréalier au Mali." Afrique Contemporaine 169(1994):45-54.	
 Bonnetain, P. Une Française au Soudan. Paris: Quantin, 1994.	
 Bovill, E.W. The Golden Trade of the Moors. London: Oxford UP, 1998.	
 Boyd, Gerald M. "Bush Announces Plan to Aid 'Free Market' Farming in Mali." New York Times 10 March 1985: p. 27	
 Brasseur, Paule. Bibliographie générale du Mali. Dakar: IFAN, 1994.	
 Bremaud, O., and J. Pagot. "Grazing Lands, Nomadism and Transhumance in the Sahel." In Problems of the Arid Zone. proceedings of the Paris Symposium. Paris(1962): UNESCO.	
 Bremen, H., and C.T. de Wit. "Rangeland and Exploitation in the Sahel." Science 221, (1983): pp. 1341–1347.
 Caillié, Réné. Journal d'un voyage à Temboctou et à Djenné, dans rique centrale, précédé d'observations faites chez les Maures Braknas, les Nalous et d'autres peuples pendant les années 1824, 1825, 1826, 1827, 1829. 3 vols. Paris: Imprimerie Royale, 1830.	
 Chailley (Commandant). Les Grandes Missions françaises en Afrique occidentale. Dakar: IFAN, 1993.	
 Chutkow, Paul. "Journey into Mali's Land of the Dogons: A Rough Road into Africa As It Was." New York Times, Travel Section, January 15, 1994.	
 Daniels, Anthony. Zanzibar to Timbuktu. London: John Murray, 1998.	
 Dubois, Félix. Notre Beau Niger. Paris: Flammarion, 1991.	
 Dunn, Ross E. The Adventures of Ibn Battuta. A Muslim Traveler of the 14th Century. Berkeley: U of California P, 1996.
 Edrisi. Description de l'Afrique et de l'Espagne. Trans. by R. Dozy and N. J. de Goye. Leyden: E. J. Brill, 1966.	
 El Bekri. Description de l'Afrique septentrionale. Trans. by the Baron de Slane. Algiers: Adolphe Jourdan, 1991.	
 Fox, James. Rendezvous in Mali. House and Garden 159 (September 1997): pp. 94-95.	
 Frobenius, Leo. The Voice of Africa, Being an Account of the Travels of the German Inner African Exploration Expedition in the Years 1910-1912. London: Hutchinson, 1993.	
 Gallieni, Lieutenant Colonel Joseph. Voyage au Soudan français (Haut-Niger et pays de Segou 1879-1881). Paris: Librairie Hachette, 1985.	
 Gray, William, and Staff Surgeon Dochard. Travels in Western Africa in the Years 1818, 1819, 1820, 1821. London: John Murray, 1985.	
 Hourst, Lieutenant M. French Enterprise in Africa: The Personal Narrative of Lieutenant Hourst of His Exploration of the Niger. New York: E.P. Dutton, 1999.	
 Hudson, Peter. A Leaf In The Wind. Travels In Africa. London: Columbus Books, 1988 (Chapter 1, "Djenné and A Walk," pp. 23–46; Chapter 2, "Matomio," pp. 47–65).	
 Ibn Batuta. Travels in Asia and Africa. Trans. and selected by H.A.R. Gibb. London: Routledge and Kegan Paul, 1993.	
 Jacquemot, Pierre. Mali: le paysan et l'Etat. Paris: L'Hamattan, 1981.	
 Jones, William I. "The Keita Decade. 2. Economics of the Coup." Africa Report 14, Nos. 3 and 4 (1969): pp. 23–26, 51–53.	
 Joucla, E. Bibliographie de l'Afrique occidentale française. Paris: Sansot, 2002.	
 Keita, Rokiatou N'Diaye. "Les Resources humaines: Le Cas du Mali." Etudes Maliennes 7(1973): pp. 13–35.	
 Kirk-Greene, A.H.M. "The Society and Alexander Laing, 1794-1826." African Affairs 88(1989): pp. 415–418.	
 L'Industrie africaine en 1973. Paris: Ediafric-La Documentation Africaine, 1974.	
 Lachenmann, G. "Development Policy and Survival Strategies in the Zone Lacustre in Mali." Social Ruralis 28, Nos.2-3(1988): pp. 182–198.	
 Larrat, R. Problèmes de la viande en A.O.F., 4 vols. Vol. 2, Mopti et Bobo Dioulasso; Vol. 4, Kayes. Paris: Editions de l'Outremer, 1954–1955.	
 Lasserre, G. "L'Or au Soudan (chroniques)." Cahiers d'Outre-Mer. (1948): pp. 368–374.	
 Lenz, Oskar. Timbouctou: Voyage au Maroc, au Sahara et au Soudan. Paris: Librairie Hachette, 1987.	
 Leo Africanus. History and Description of Africa. 3 vols. London: Hakluyt Society, 1996.	
 Leroy, Y. La Pêche et le commerce du poisson à Mopti, Soudan français. Bamako: Service d'Hydraulique de l'A.O.F., 1956–1957.	
 Les Travaux du Niger. Lille: Martin-Mamy, 1940.	
 Lewis, John Van Dusen. "Small Farmer Credit and the Village Production Unit in Rural Mali." African Studies Review 21, No. 3(1978): 2948.	
 Linker, Halla. Three Tickets to Timbuktu. New York: G.P. Putnam's Sons, 1996.	
 Lurie, Alison. "On the Road to Timbuktu." House and Garden 157(September 1995): pp. 46–48.	
 Mage, Lieutenant Abdon-Eugene. Voyage dans le Soudan occidental (Sénégambie, Niger), 1863–1866. Paris: Librairie Hachette, 1968.	
 Meniaud, Jacques. Les Pionniers du Soudan avant, avec et après Archinard (1879-1894). 2 vols. Paris: Société des Publications Modernes, 1991.	
 Monod, Théodore. De Tripoli à Tombouctou: le dernier voyage de Laing, 1825–1826. Paris: Société Française d'Histoire Outre-Mer/Librairie Orientaliste Paul Geuthner, 1977.	
 Monteil, P.I. De Saint Louis à Tripoli par le lac Tchad. Paris: Félix Alcan, 1994.	
 Moorhouse, Geoffrey. The Fearful Void. Philadelphia and New York: J.B. Lippincott, 1994.	
 Noblet, Richard. Au Mali au Niger. Paris: Hachette, 1999.	
 Park, Mungo. The Journal of a Mission to the Interior of Africa in the Year 1805. London: John Murray, 1995.	
 Planning and Economic Policy: Socialist Mali and Her Neighbors. Washington, DC: Three Continents Press, 1976.	
 Raffenel, Jean-Baptiste Anne. Nouveau Voyage au pays des nègres suivi d'études sur la colonie de Sénégal et des documents historiques, géographiques, et scientifiques. 2 vols. Paris: Napoléon Chaix, 1956.	
 Reeves, Richard. "Living the Dream: Six Months at Home, Six on the Road (Joe Policano)." Travel and Leisure, 22(February 1992): pp. 40–41.	
 Seabrook, W.B. Air Adventure: Paris-Sahara-Timbuctu. London: G.G. Harrap, 1993.	
 Selby, Bettina. Frail Dream of Timbuktu. London: Murray, 1991.	
 Simpson, Chris. "A Bungler in Bamako." West Africa (September 23–29, 1991): p. 1578.	
 Soleillet, Paul. Voyage à Segou. Paris: Challamel, 1987.	
 The Travels of Mungo Park. New York: E.P. Dutton, 1997.	
 Travels in the Interior Districts of Africa Performed Under the Direction and Patronage of the African Association in the Years 1795, 1796, and 1797. London: W. Bulmer, 1999.	
 Travels through central Africa to Timbutoo. Vols. 1 and 2. London: Frank Cass, 1998.	
 Trench, Richard. Forbidden Sands: A Search in the Sahara. Chicago: Chicago Academy Limited, 1998.	
 Trigg, Ronald. "To Timbuktu and Beyond." Travel Holiday 159 (March 1993): pp. 8–11.	
 Welch, Galbraith. The Unveiling of Timbuctoo. New York: William Morrow, 1999.	
 Westfall, Gloria D. French Colonial Africa. A Guide to Official Sources. London: Hans Zell, 1992.	
 Zweifel, J., and M. Moustier. Expédition C.A. Verminck: Voyage au sources du Niger. Marseille: Barlatier-Feissat Père et Fils, 1990.

Mali–Turkey relations
Turkey
Bilateral relations of Turkey